Satty Davies Gogwim (born 27 July 1949) was elected Senator for the Plateau Central Senatorial District of Plateau State, Nigeria, taking office on 29 May 2007. He is a member of the People's Democratic Party (PDP).

Gogwim obtained an advanced diploma in Accounts/Budgeting, a Diploma in Law and an advanced diploma in Law / Conflict Management at the University of Jos.
He became a Finance Officer In The Nigerian Army, Administrative Officer, Audit Officer and Budget Officer.

Political career  
Gogwim was elected to represent Plateau Central in the Senate in the April 2007 elections on the Action Congress (AC) ticket.
However, he later transferred to the PDP due to frustration with the AC national leadership.
After taking his seat in the Senate, he was appointed to committees on Water Resources, Privatization, Integration & Cooperation, Industry, Independent National Electoral Commission and Drugs Narcotics Anti Corruption.

In a mid-term evaluation of Senators in May 2009, ThisDay noted that Gogwim had sponsored bills for National Visual Testing and safety Scheme, National Health Insurance Scheme Act Amendment, National Infrastructure Development Fund and Compulsory HIV Testing of Alleged Sexual Offenders, and co-sponsored other motions. He contributed well to debates in plenary while engaging himself with committee activities.

In an interview in January 2010, Gogwim talked about the ongoing dispute in Plateau State between Governor Jonah Jang and the faction led by former senator Ibrahim Mantu and ex-governor Joshua Dariye, saying all the problems in the state were in their hands.
He also spoke against the proposal that politicians who left their party should automatically lose their seats, noting that when he switched to the PDP all his people had come with him and only troublemakers had stayed behind in the AC.

References

Living people
1949 births
Plateau State
Peoples Democratic Party members of the Senate (Nigeria)
Action Congress of Nigeria politicians
21st-century Nigerian politicians